GCRT may refer to:

G:link, formerly Gold Coast Rapid Transit, light rail system in Queensland, Australia
Gender Centre for Research and Training, Sudanese organisation
GCRT J1745−3009, a transient, bursting low-frequency radio source